Weneg (or, alternatively, Uneg) is the name of:
 Weneg (Egyptian deity), a sky- and death deity from Egyptian religion
 Weneg (pharaoh), a well attested but chronologically unfixed king of Egyptian second dynasty